NBA Courtside 2 Featuring Kobe Bryant is a basketball video game developed by Left Field Productions and published by Nintendo for the Nintendo 64. The game was released in North America exclusively in 1999. It is the sequel to Kobe Bryant in NBA Courtside and features NBA star Kobe Bryant on its cover. Bryant also performed the motion capture for the game.

A Game Boy Color version of the game was released at the same time, entitled NBA 3 on 3 Featuring Kobe Bryant.

The third and final edition in the Courtside series, NBA Courtside 2002 was released for the GameCube in 2002.

Gameplay 
This game features rosters from the 1999–2000 NBA Season. The ability to play multiple seasons has been added. New features include the ability to play a three-point contest and additional options for creating a player from scratch. The game features improved artificial intelligence helps to improve the realism of the gameplay.

New dunk styles are possible to implement and enhanced motion capturing allows the no-look pass to be used during gameplay. There are more than 300 players and games can either be a realistic simulation of actual NBA action or a full-blown arcade experience. Plays such as the isolation play, the post up, and the triangle offense can be called.

Reception 

NBA Courtside 2 received "favorable" reviews, while NBA 3 on 3 received "average" reviews, according to the review aggregation website GameRankings.

References

External links 

1999 video games
Game Boy Color games
Left Field Productions games
National Basketball Association video games
NBA Courtside
Nintendo 64 games
Nintendo games
North America-exclusive video games
Kobe Bryant
Multiplayer and single-player video games
Video games based on real people
Cultural depictions of basketball players
Cultural depictions of American men
Video games developed in the United States
Video game sequels
Black people in art